Andrew James Hamilton Lownie  (born November 1961) is a British biographer and literary agent.

Biography
He was educated at Westminster School and Magdalene College, Cambridge, and was President of the Cambridge Union in Easter term 1984. He has a master's degree and doctorate from the University of Edinburgh, and is a Fellow of the Royal Historical Society. His dissertation at Edinburgh was titled: Stalin's Englishman: The Lives of Guy Burgess.

Lownie founded his eponymous literary agency in 1988. It specialises in non-fiction, representing some 200 authors, and is reported to have "regularly been the top selling agent in the world."

He has published biographies of writer John Buchan, spy Guy Burgess and Lord Mountbatten and his wife Edwina. While researching for his book on the Mountbattens, Lownie found himself blocked by the Cabinet Office and University of Southampton, despite public money being used in 2011 to acquire their archive to "ensure public access". In 2021, Lownie published The Traitor King, a biography, based on fresh sources, of the Duke of Windsor. The former Edward VIII is alleged by Lownie to have been a Nazi sympathiser who gave aid and comfort to his country’s enemies before and during the Second World War.

Lownie also wrote a literary guide to Edinburgh, and has edited several volumes of John Buchan's works. He founded, and is President of, The Biographers' Club, a group "committed to supporting, promoting and connecting biographers at all levels".

Selected publications

 (earlier ed 1992 Canongate Press)

References

External links
Andrew Lownie literary agency website

1961 births
Living people
British biographers
Literary agents
People educated at Westminster School, London
Alumni of Magdalene College, Cambridge
Alumni of the University of Edinburgh
Fellows of the Royal Historical Society